Richard Carlisle Crawford is an American politician. He served as mayor of Tulsa, Oklahoma from 1986 to 1988. A Republican, he defeated independent Patty Eaton and 18 other candidates in the 1986 election for the mayor's chair. He was defeated in 1988 for re-election by Rodger Randle. He is an alumnus of Ohio State University.

References

Living people
Mayors of Tulsa, Oklahoma
Ohio State University alumni
Oklahoma Republicans
Place of birth missing (living people)
Year of birth missing (living people)